"Live Louder" is a song recorded by Australian singer-songwriter Nathaniel Willemse. It was released on 5 September 2014 as the third single from his debut studio album Yours.

Background
A 90-second preview of "Live Louder" was released on 20 August 2014 via Willemse's VEVO account.

It became available for pre-order from 22 August 2014.

Promotion
"Live Louder" received significant promotion due to its use in a television commercial promotion for the 14th season of Dancing with the Stars Australia. Willemse performed the song live on the verdict show for the sixth season of The X Factor Australia on 15 September 2014.
Live Louder has since been sampled as the closing song in the first episode of the new Disney Channel original Ravens Home, a spin off of the 2000s comedy That's So Raven starring Raven Symone.
The song also features on the soundtrack of the 2015 Australian film "Sucker", which stars Timothy Spall, Shaun Micallef and Kat Stewart.

Music video
The official video clip was released on 4 September 2014 via Willemse's VEVO account. Some of the scenes in the video clip bears a resemblance to "Need You Tonight" by INXS.

Track listing
Digital download
 "Live Louder" – 3:09

Remixes
 "Live Louder" (7th Heaven Remix) – 3:19
 "Live Louder" (7th Heaven Club Mix) – 5:58
 "Live Louder" (David Konsky Remix) – 3:22

Charts
"Live Louder" debuted at number 22 on the Australian ARIA Singles Chart and peaked at number 4 two weeks later.

Weekly charts

Year-end charts

Certifications

References

2014 singles
2014 songs
Nathaniel Willemse songs
Songs written by David Musumeci
Songs written by Anthony Egizii
Song recordings produced by DNA Songs
Sony Music Australia singles